Macon, Georgia is the tenth studio album by American country music artist Jason Aldean. It is a double album, with the first half, Macon, released on November 12, 2021, and Georgia, the second half, released on April 22, 2022.

Content 
Preceding the release of Macon was the release of the single "If I Didn't Love You", featuring Carrie Underwood. The album's full tracklist was revealed on September 27, 2021. Aldean said of the album, "Where you were raised has such a big influence on who you become, and for me it’s no different."

Critical reception 
Stephen Thomas Erlewine of AllMusic, while criticizing both sides of the album for delivering only a similar sound and vocal attack to "Burnin' It Down", praised Macon by stating "By changing gears every so often, Aldean manages to give Macon a slight hint of a pulse." Erlewine also criticized Macon for its use of five live tracks while offering only ten new tracks, and drubbed Georgia for Aldean's use of AutoTune on the track "Ain't Enough Cowboy" while relying on his old tricks for every other track. He also stating that "maybe Aldean delivers what fans want, but he has no ambition greater than ensuring that Georgia is a relatively polished piece of crowd-pleasing product."

Commercial performance 
Macon debuted at number eight on the Billboard 200, earning 37,000 units, of which 19,000 were album units. It also debuted at number three on the Top Country Albums chart, as well as number one on the Independent Albums chart, making it his eighth consecutive number one on the latter chart.

Georgia also debuted at number eight on the Billboard 200, earning 26,000 album-equivalent units, including 13,000 pure album sales.

Track listing

Personnel

Macon 
Adapted from Macon liner notes.

Musicians 
 Jason Aldean – lead vocals, acoustic guitar (tracks 11–15)
 Rich Redmond – drums, percussion
 Tully Kennedy – bass guitar, programming, background vocals (tracks 11–15)
 Kurt Allison – electric guitar, programming
 Jack Sizemore – electric guitar and background vocals (tracks 11–15)
 Jay Jackson – steel guitar and background vocals (tracks 11–15)
 Adam Shoenfeld – electric guitar, slide guitar
 Danny Rader – acoustic guitar, 12-string guitar, hi-strung guitar
 Russ Pahl – steel guitar
 Mike Johnson – steel guitar
 Tony Harrell – synth, piano, keys, Wurlitzer, B3
 Micah Wilshire – acoustic guitar, programming
 Blake Bollinger – programming
 Michael Knox – programming
 Carrie Underwood – featured vocals (track 5)
 Perry Coleman – background vocals
 Mickey Jack Cones – background vocals
 Lydia Vaughan – background vocals
 Neil Thrasher – background vocals

Technical 
 Michael Knox – producer (tracks 1–10)
 Jeff Braun – mixing (tracks 1–10)
 Brandon Epps – assistant engineer, editing engineer (tracks 1–10)
 Chris Stephens – producer (tracks 11–15)
 Josh Reynolds – mixing (tracks 11–15)
 Matthew Singler – editing engineer (tracks 11–15)
 Adam Ayan – mastering
 Shalacy Griffin – production coordinator

Georgia 
Adapted from Georgia liner notes.

Musicians 
 Jason Aldean – lead vocals, acoustic guitar (tracks 11-15)
 Rich Redmond – drums, percussion
 Tully Kennedy – bass guitar, programming, background vocals (tracks 11–15)
 Kurt Allison – electric guitar, programming
 Jack Sizemore – electric guitar and background vocals (tracks 11–15)
 Jay Jackson – steel guitar and background vocals (tracks 11–15)
 Adam Shoenfeld – electric guitar, slide guitar
 Danny Rader – acoustic guitar, 12-string guitar, hi-strung guitar
 Russ Pahl – steel guitar
 Tony Harrell – synth, keys, B3
 Lalo – keys, electric guitar, programming
 Blake Bollinger – programming
 Michael Knox – programming
 Jacob Rice – programming
 Chris Thompkins – programming (tracks 11-15)
 Jerry Roe – programming (tracks 11-15)
 Perry Coleman – background vocals
 Micah Wilshire – background vocals
 Neil Thrasher – background vocals
 Michael Tyler – background vocals (tracks 11-15)

Technical 
 Michael Knox – producer (tracks 1-10)
 Jeff Braun – mixing (tracks 1-10)
 Brandon Epps – assistant engineer, editing engineer (tracks 1–10)
 Chris Stephens – producer (tracks 11–15)
 Josh Reynolds – mixing (tracks 11–15)
 Matthew Singler – editing engineer (tracks 11–15)
 Adam Ayan – mastering
 Shalacy Griffin – production coordinator

Charts

Weekly charts

Macon

Georgia

Year-end charts

Macon

Georgia

References 

2021 albums
2022 albums
Jason Aldean albums
BBR Music Group albums